Filatima platyochra is a moth of the family Gelechiidae. It is found in North America, where it has been recorded from California.

The wingspan is 17–18 mm. The forewings are sordid white heavily overlaid with drab. On the costa and tornus, white spots indicate an obsolete transverse line at apical fourth and there is a dash in the fold, about the middle, and discal sepia spots at the center and end of the cell, broadly edged with white. There are some brownish ochreous scales along the costa and following the veins. The hindwings are pale shining grey basally, shading to fuscous around the margins.

References

Moths described in 1947
Filatima